A national monument is a monument constructed in order to commemorate something of importance to national heritage, such as a country's founding, independence, war, or the life and death of a historical figure.

The term may also refer to a specific monument status, such as a national heritage site, by reason of their cultural importance rather than age (see National Monument (United States)).

National monument status is usually granted to colossal symbols of national identity.

Overview
Structures or areas deemed to be of national importance and afforded protection by the state are part of a country's cultural heritage.  These national heritage sites are often called something different per country and are listed by national conservation societies. Romania has listed at least one plant as a national monument, Nymphaea lotus f. thermalis.

Example

National monument
National Monument (Bosnia and Herzegovina)
The National Monument (Central Jakarta)
Maqam Echahid (Algiers)
The Pakistan Monument (Islamabad)
The National Martyr's Memorial (Dhaka)
The National Monument (Kuala Lumpur)
The Netherlands National Monument (Amsterdam)
The National Monument of Scotland (Edinburgh)
National Monument to Victor Emmanuel II (Rome)
National Kaiser Wilhelm Monument (Berlin)
Pobednik (Belgrade)

National heritage sites
National heritage sites of South Africa
National Monuments of Colombia
National monuments of Ireland
National monuments of Portugal
National monuments of Singapore
National monuments of Spain
National monument (United States)
List of national monuments of the United States

See also
Cultural identity
National icon
National memorial (disambiguation)
National myth

References

Types of monuments and memorials
National symbols

es:Monumento nacional